A supply-side platform (SSP) or sell-side platform is a technology platform to enable web publishers and digital out-of-home (DOOH) media owners to manage their advertising inventory, fill it with ads, and receive revenue. Many of the larger web publishers of the world use a supply-side platform to automate and optimize the selling of their online media space.

A supply-side platform interfaces on the publisher side to advertising networks and exchanges, which in turn interface to demand-side platforms (DSP) on the advertiser side.

This system allows advertisers to put online advertising and DOOH advertising before a selected target audience. SSPs send potential impressions into ad exchanges, where DSPs purchase them on marketers' behalf, depending on specific targeting attributes and audience data. By offering impressions to as many potential buyers as possible publishers can maximize the revenue. Therefore, SSPs are sometimes referred to as yield-optimization platforms.

Often, real-time bidding (RTB) is used to complete DSP transactions.

Unlike advertising networks that target buyers (advertisers), supply-side platforms provide services for publishers (website, app, and DOOH owners). Supply-side platforms are often integrated into the structure of advertising and ad serving companies, as well as ad exchanges that work with both publishers (supply side) and advertisers (demand side).

Flowchart

Examples 
Equativ
OpenX
Lemma
Pubmatic
Magnite Inc
Smaato
SpotX
Verizon Media
Xandr (formerly AppNexus)
Google Ad Manager

See also
 Ad exchange
 Demand-side platform

References

Online advertising